Penmanshiel Tunnel is a now-disused railway tunnel near Grantshouse, Berwickshire, in the Scottish Borders region of Scotland. It was formerly part of the East Coast Main Line between Berwick-upon-Tweed and Dunbar.

The tunnel was constructed between 1845 and 1846 by contractors Ross and Mitchell, to a design by John Miller, who was the Engineer to the North British Railway. Upon completion, the tunnel was inspected by the Inspector-General of Railways, Major-General Charles Pasley, on behalf of the Board of Trade.

During its 134-year existence, the tunnel was the location of two incidents investigated by HM Railway Inspectorate. The first was in 1949, when a serious fire destroyed two carriages of a south-bound express from Edinburgh. Seven passengers were injured, but there were no deaths.

The second incident occurred on 17 March 1979 when, during improvement works, a length of the tunnel suddenly collapsed. Thirteen workers managed to escape, but two were killed. Later it was determined that it would be too dangerous and difficult to rebuild the tunnel, so it was sealed up and a new alignment was made for the railway, in a cutting to the west of the hill.

The tunnel was also affected by the August 1948 floods. The damage caused by these floods led to the abandonment of much of the railway network in the south east of Scotland.

August 1948 floods
On 12 August 1948, 6.25 inches (160 mm) of rain fell in the area, the total for the week being 10.5 inches (265 mm). Rain falling on the Lammermuir Hills surged into the Eye Water towards Reston, and the channel could not accommodate all of the water. The flood water then backed up the tunnel and flowed to sea in the opposite direction, towards Cockburnspath. The tunnel was flooded to within  of the crown of the portal.

Train fire (1949)
On the evening of 23 June 1949 a fire broke out in the tenth coach of an express passenger train from Edinburgh to King's Cross, about  beyond Cockburnspath. The train stopped somewhere near the tunnel, within one and a quarter minutes of the fire starting, but the fire spread rapidly and with such ferocity that, within seconds, the brake-composite carriage was engulfed and the fire had spread to the coach in front. Most passengers escaped by running to the guard's compartment or forwards along the corridor, but some were compelled to break the windows and jump down onto the track. One lady was seriously injured by doing this.

The train crew reacted quickly to the incident. The two coaches behind the two ablaze were uncoupled and pushed back, leaving them isolated up the line. Having drawn forward and uncoupled the two burning vehicles, the driver proceeded with the front eight coaches to Grantshouse station.

The cause of the fire was thought to be a cigarette end or lighted match dropped against a partition in the corridor, the surface of which was found to have been coated with a highly-flammable lacquer. Subsequent analysis of the lacquer indicated that it was composed of nearly 17% nitrocellulose and sustained "startling" combustion. Draughts of air from the open windows may have fanned the flames.

Despite the noxious fumes and the severity of the blaze, which reduced the two carriages to their underframes, only seven passengers were injured, with no fatalities.

Tunnel collapse (1979)

The next significant event to occur at the tunnel led to its abandonment.

Upgrading work
Work was being carried out to increase the internal dimension of the tunnel to allow intermodal containers  in height to travel through it on flat wagons. This was done by lowering the track, in a process involving removing the existing track and ballast, digging out the floor of the tunnel and then laying new track set on a concrete base.

As the tunnel was on a very busy main line, and in order to minimise the disruption to passenger and freight services, it was decided that each of the two tracks through the tunnel would be renewed separately, with trains continuing to run on the adjacent open track.

Work was completed on the "Up" (southbound) track by 10 March 1979, and trains were then transferred to this track by the following day, to allow the "Down" (northbound) track to be modified.

Tunnel collapse
He decided that it would be wise to shore up the affected piece of the tunnel and was making his way towards the site office to arrange this when he heard the sound of the tunnel collapsing behind him.

The thirteen other people working inside the tunnel at the time of the collapse were able to escape successfully, but despite the efforts of rescuers (including a specialised mine rescue team) it was not possible to reach the two operators or to recover their bodies.

Official report

An official HM Railway Inspectorate report was prepared by Lieutenant Colonel I.K.A. McNaughton and released on 2 August 1983. The report concluded that it was impossible to be certain as to the cause of the collapse as access could not be gained to the collapsed portion of the tunnel, and also because investigations into the remaining tunnel structure made no significant findings.

However, geotechnical investigations of the area surrounding the tunnel found evidence suggesting fracturing of rock overlaying the tunnel and, in particular, an anticlinal structure of shattered and sheared rock intersecting the line of the tunnel in close proximity to the area of the collapse. This structure only became apparent during excavation of the cutting for the replacement alignment (discussed below), and it was considered "most unlikely" that the "extreme complexity" of the geology could ever have been appreciated by investigation of rock exposed in the tunnel or though other routine investigatory techniques.

The report accordingly concluded that the collapse was likely to be the result of degeneration of the fractured rock overlying the tunnel, which progressively increased the loading on the tunnel's brick arch ring in a way that could not adequately be distributed into the surrounding hillside. It was further noted that these conditions had quite possibly made the tunnel "dangerously unstable" for many years prior to the collapse, and that the collapse would likely have occurred at some time or another even had the enlargement works not been undertaken.

Finally the report stated that—as the conditions leading to the collapse could not reasonably be foreseen—there were no grounds for finding any individual responsible for the accident. Despite this the British Railways Board was charged in the High Court of Justiciary in Edinburgh with "having failed to do all that was reasonably practical to ensure that persons in the tunnel were not exposed to the risk of personal injury by the collapse of part of the [tunnel] structure", on the basis that no geotechnical survey—whether futile or not—had been conducted prior to the works commencing. The Board entered a guilty plea and was fined £10,000.

Replacement works

In the aftermath of the collapse British Rail originally intended to repair and re-open the tunnel, but this was ruled out as being excessively dangerous and difficult once investigations revealed the extent of the collapse. It was judged instead that it would be more expedient and cost-effective to construct a new alignment for the railway that bypassed the tunnel.

This in turn necessitated a similar westward realignment of the A1 trunk road. The contractor Sir Robert McAlpine & Sons Ltd started work on the new railway alignment on 7 May 1979, and it was completed on 20 August. The portals of the collapsed tunnel were sealed to prevent further access, and the approach cuttings were filled.

During the closure, some trains from King's Cross terminated at Berwick, with onward services being provided by a fleet of buses, some towing trailers for luggage. The bus service went as far as Dunbar, where a railway shuttle took over between Dunbar and Edinburgh. 
Other InterCity services reached Edinburgh by diverting from the East Coast Main Line at Newcastle and travelling via Carlisle and Carstairs.

Visible remains

Since the tunnel was closed, the landscape has gradually 'returned to nature'. The southern portal has been covered by the hillside, and the only clues to the route of the old line are a dry-stone wall marking the railway boundary, and a disused bridge that used to carry the A1 main road over the line.

Memorial

A three-sided obelisk was erected over the point where the tunnel collapsed to act as a memorial. One face of the obelisk displays a cross, while each of the other two faces commemorates one of the men killed.

The memorial is adjacent to a road running over the hill and is marked on 1:50,000 and 1:25,000 scale OS maps, at grid reference NT 797670. From the maps it is also possible to determine the abandoned section of the A1 road, but the original course of the railway is not visible.

See also
Railway accidents in Scotland
List of places in the Scottish Borders
List of places in Scotland

References

Citations

Sources

Further reading

External links

Railscot location details for Penmanshiel Tunnel, including photographs.
A4 60004 "William Whitelaw" emerging from Penmanshiel Tunnel; photograph taken on 22 June 1959 showing the southern portal and road bridge.

Tunnels completed in 1846
Railway tunnels in Scotland
Tunnels in the Scottish Borders
East Coast Main Line